Dheriyaa is a 1994 Maldivian romantic drama film directed by Mohamed Niyaz. Produced by Abdul Muhaimin under Club Scope , the film stars debutant Ali Khalid and his then wife, Hawwa Zahira in pivotal roles.

Premise
Ashraf (Ali Khalid), a womanizer from a middle class family is smitten by a poster girl, Shan (Hawwa Zahira) and accepts the bet of his best friend, Ibrey (Ahmed Shimau) to initiate a romantic relationship with her. The night she had her last stage performance, Ashraf approaches to her which creates a brief spark between them, though she is already engaged to an overprotective boyfriend, Iqbal (Ibrahim Waheed). They slowly bond and spend time together for a month until Shan refuses to be intimate with him. Strong-willed, Ashraf is sure that Shan will return to him momentarily. Things go according to his plan, as Shan comes begging for his love while submitting to him, though he decides to break up with her once his desires are fulfilled.

As convinced by Ibrey and his mother, Dhon Kabulo (Arifa Ibrahim), Ashraf continues his relationship with Shan. Their affair is brought to the attention of Shan's parent, where her father, Solih (Koyya Hassan Manik rebuffs it as false accusation until he witnesses them intimate together. Furious, he forbids her from going and tries bribing Ashraf to stay away from his family. Hesitantly, Solih agrees for their marriage though his decision to disown Shan after her wedding remains firm.

Cast 
Ali Khalid as Ashraf
Hawwa Zahira as Shan
Koyya Hassan Manik as Solih
Arifa Ibrahim as Dhon Kabulo
Hawwa Riyaza as Nadhiya
Maryam Waheedha as Zahida 
Ibrahim Waheed as Iqbal
Ahmed Shimau as Ibrey
Reeko Moosa Manik as Nasif
Ibrahim Rasheedh as Hashim
Fathimath Rashfa as Maria
Baby Aish as Aish
Aishath Rasheedha as Liusha
Maryam Hajara as Faraha
Mohamed Hussain as Mahmood
Waheeda as Fathuma
Sadna as Fazla
Ismail Imthiyaz as Zahir
Khadeeja Moosa as Hidhaa
J.Athula Siri as Rodrigo
Mohamed Zahir as Waleed
Aisth Hanim as Zuheyra
Hassan Haleem as Kumar
Zareena Ibrahim as Shameema

Development
On announcing the film with a fresh face as a leading actor, the audience and the media was skeptical if director Mohamed Niyaz could deliver the required  emotion and acting from the cast. Recalling his memory as a debutant in the film, Khalid called his character to a "challenging role" in which he initially had double thoughts for accepting a role of a negative character to make his first impression. During the filming, Khalid underwent minor injuries as a car accident stunt went wrong which led to the non-restrained car hitting him in real.

Soundtrack

Reception
Upon release, the film received positive reviews from critics where it was considered a "path-breaking" film for mainstream cinema. Praising the film and its production in 2015, Ahmed Nadheem from Avas wrote: "Under the helm of Tedry, in his directorial debut with newcomers as the main cast, Dheriyaa is a masterpiece and can still be considered relevant even after decades after its release". According to Nadheem, with this film, Niyaz has established him as the most accomplished director of the industry even though he is one film old.

The film was a box office success where it was recorded to be the first Maldivian film to cross MVR 200,000. Having screened a total of thirty two houseful shows at Olympus Cinema, the lifetime collection of the film was recorded at MVR 900,000 and held the record of highest grossing Maldivian film till the release of Fathimath Nahula's Yoosuf in 2008.

Accolades

Sequel
In March 2021, Muhaimin announced that he intended to develop a sequel of Dheriyaa.

References

External links 
 

1994 films
Maldivian romantic drama films
1994 romantic drama films
Dhivehi-language films